The People's Socialist Party (Serbo-Croatian: Narodno-socijalistička stranka, Slovenian: Narodno-socialistična stranka) was a Yugoslav political party in the Kingdom of Yugoslavia. It was formed through a split from the Yugoslav Democratic Party on 7 December 1919. It aimed towards a specific popular socialism as a third position between liberalism and social democracy. Its leader was Ljubljana's mayor Anton Pesek and they won two seats in the 1920 Kingdom of Serbs, Croats and Slovenes Constitutional Assembly election. The Party closely cooperated with the Czechoslovak National Socialist Party in Czechoslovakia, and during the 1927 elections with the Yugoslav Independent Democratic Party.

Political parties in the Kingdom of Yugoslavia
Socialism in the Kingdom of Yugoslavia
Yugoslav Slovenia
Socialist parties in Slovenia